Arthur James Duncan (21 November 1856 – 26 August 1936) was an English first-class cricketer. He was a right-handed batsman and made his first-class debut for Hampshire in 1878 against Kent. Duncan's second and last first-class match came against Sussex in 1883.

Family
Duncan's brother, Dunbar Duncan also represented Hampshire in first-class matches.

External links
Arthur Duncan at Cricinfo
Arthur Duncan at CricketArchive

1856 births
1936 deaths
Cricketers from Southampton
English cricketers
Hampshire cricketers